Buzanjan-e Sofla (also Romanized as Būzanjān-e Soflá; also known as Būrenjān) is a village in Beyza Rural District, Beyza District, Sepidan County, Fars Province, Iran. At the 2006 census, its population was 81, in 18 families.

References 

Populated places in Beyza County